Colias tyche, the Booth's sulphur or pale Arctic clouded yellow, is a butterfly in the family Pieridae. It is found from Baffin Island west along the Hudson Bay and arctic coasts of the Nunavut and Northwest Territories mainland and the southern tier of Arctic Islands to northern Yukon, Alaska, and Eurasia.

The wingspan is 28–43 mm.

The butterfly flies in June to August depending on the location.

The larvae feed on legume species.

Subspecies
C. t. tyche (northern Eurasia)
C. t. antonkozlovi Yakovlev, 2020 (Russia, Northern Siberia, Taimyr Peninsula, Plateau Putorana)
C. t. relicta Kurentzov, 1970 (Chukot Peninsula, Far East)
C. t. werdandi Zetterstedt, 1839 (northern Europe)
C. t. magadanica Churkin, Grieshuber, Bogdanov & Zamolodchikov, 2001 (Magadan)
C. t. flinti Churkin, Grieshuber, Bogdanov & Zamolodchikov, 2001 (Wrangel Island)
C. t. olga Churkin, Grieshuber, Bogdanov & Zamolodchikov, 2001  (East Chukotka) 
C. t. boothii Curtis, 1835 (Northwest Territories, Yukon, Baffin Island, Victoria Island, Banks Island, Alaska)
C. t. thula Hovanitz, 1955 (Alaska and in Canada on Banks, Victoria and Melville Islands) may be a full species.

Both of the Nearctic subspecies C. t. boothii (Booth's sulphur) and C. t. thula (Thula sulphur) are treated as valid species by some authors.

Similar species
 Hecla sulphur (C. hecla)
 Labrador sulphur (C. nastes)

References

Sources
Churkin, S., Grieshuber, J ., Bogdanov, P. & Zamolodchikov, D. (2001). Taxonomic notes on Colias tyche Böber, 1812 and Colias nastes Boisduval, 1832 (Lepidoptera, Pieridae) from the Russian Far East with the descriptions of new subspecies. Helios 2:103-116, pls.8-10.
Churkin, S., Grieshuber, J ., Bogdanov, P. & Zamolodchikov, D. (2001). Ein Ersatzname für eine kürzlich beschriebene Unterart von Colias tyche Böber, 1912 (Lepidoptera, Pieridae). Atalanta 32(1/2):262-263.

External links
Booth's sulphur, Neactica.com
Booth's sulphur, Alaska, Butterflies and moths of North America
State Darwin Museum Darwin Museum type specimen images of Colias tyche olga Churkin, Greishuber, Bogdanov et Zamolodchikov, 2001

tyche
Butterflies of Europe
Insects of the Arctic
Butterflies described in 1812